Dave Marsh (born March 1, 1950) is an American music critic, and radio talk show host. He was an early editor of Creem magazine, has written for various publications such as Newsday, The Village Voice, and Rolling Stone, and has published numerous books about music and musicians, mostly focused on rock music. He is also a committee member of the Rock and Roll Hall of Fame.

Early life

Marsh was born in Pontiac, Michigan. Moving to Waterford, Michigan in 1964. He graduated from Waterford Kettering High School in Waterford, Michigan in 1968. He then briefly attended Wayne State University in Detroit.

Career
He began his career as a rock critic and editor at Creem magazine, which he helped start. At Creem, he was mentored by close friend and colleague Lester Bangs. Marsh is credited with coining the term punk rock in a 1971 article he wrote about Question Mark & the Mysterians. While supportive of punk music in general, he said in a 2001 interview that "I don't know that it was any more important than disco," and believes rap is more significant than punk in the history of rock music.

He has written extensively about his favorite artists, including Marvin Gaye, whose song "I Heard It Through the Grapevine" he chose as the number one single of all-time in his book The Heart of Rock and Soul: the 1001 Greatest Singles Ever Made, and Sly Stone, whom he called "one of the greatest musical adventurers rock has ever known."

Along with Rolling Stone magazine publisher Jann Wenner, Marsh has been involved in organizing and maintaining the Rock and Roll Hall of Fame in Cleveland, Ohio. Marsh has at times courted controversy with his style of maintaining selections.

Marsh has published four books about  Bruce Springsteen. Some of these became bestsellers, including Born to Run and Glory Days.

Marsh has edited and contributed to Rock and Roll Confidential, a newsletter about rock music and social issues. The newsletter has since been renamed Rock and Rap Confidential. Marsh contributed to the 1994 book Mid-Life Confidential, a book about and by the Rock Bottom Remainders, a rock band composed of American authors. He has also worked for Newsday and The Real Paper.

Marsh's book 360 Sound: The Columbia Records Story — Legends and Legacy, was released in October 2012, as a companion to Sean Wilentz's book 360 Sound: The Columbia Records Story. In the same format as Heart of Rock and Soul, this book covers the 264 greatest songs from Columbia Records beginning with the 1890 performance of John Philip Sousa's "Washington Post March" and working its way chronologically up to Adele's "Rolling in the Deep" (2011). To promote the music of Columbia Records, Legends and Legacy is available as a free eBook on iTunes."

Derision of musicians
Marsh has been characterised as a "grumpy rock and roll journalist" due to his acerbic comments on popular musicians whom he dislikes. In 1976, he wrote that Led Zeppelin had an "insurmountable flaw" in drummer John Bonham (who has topped multiple all-time greatest drummers lists), whom he saw as "something like clinically incompetent" and responsible for marring every Zeppelin album to date.

Marsh wrote in 1978: "Queen isn't here just to entertain. This group has come to make it clear exactly who is superior and who is inferior. Its anthem, 'We Will Rock You', is a marching order: you will not rock us, we will rock you. Indeed, Queen may be the first truly fascist rock band...[I] wonder why anyone would indulge these creeps and their polluting ideas." Marsh had previously described Queen frontman Freddie Mercury – who is regarded as one of the best rock singers of all time – as possessing a "passable pop voice".

Marsh described Bob Seger's 1980 album Against the Wind as "absolutely cowardly". He was much more supportive of Seger's earlier work.

In the 1983 Rolling Stone Record Guide, Marsh called Journey "a dead end for San Francisco area rock", and their music "calculated". He awarded every single Journey album released up to that point – seven studio albums, a compilation album and a live album – the minimum possible score of 1/5 stars. When asked about Marsh's unrelenting derision of Journey on a 1986 television program during which other critics had defended the band, lead singer Steve Perry called Marsh "an unusual little man who all too often thinks that his subjective opinions translate to inarguable fact".

Also in the 1983 Rolling Stone Record Guide, Marsh described Air Supply as "The most calculated and soulless pseudo-group of its kind, which is saying something".

In 1989, Marsh referred to the Grateful Dead as the "worst band in creation".

Regarding a possible Rock and Roll Hall of Fame induction for Kiss, Marsh said: "Kiss is not a great band. Kiss was never a great band. Kiss never will be a great band, and I have done my share to keep them off the ballot." Kiss were ultimately inducted in 2014; in the lead-up, Marsh said: "I was done with them before I ever turned the first album over to the second side... all that mediocrity was harmless enough until the boastful bassist decided to turn it into a propaganda machine for the only two things he's ever loved: Gene Simmons and money." Lead singer Paul Stanley described Marsh as "pompous", and pointed to his derision of Led Zeppelin and Queen as evidence that he had "no clue" about music.

In the March 13, 1975 edition of Rolling Stone, Marsh was one of a number of critics asked about Bob Dylan's Blood on the Tracks. Marsh wrote: "The long songs, particularly, suffer from flat, tangled imagery, and the music, with all its hints at the old glory, is often incompetently performed. I suppose it's all a matter of what you're willing to settle for."

Talk shows
Dave Marsh hosts three Sirius XM Radio shows, one called Live from E Street Nation, airing on E Street Radio and the second Kick Out the Jams, airing Sundays on music talk channel Volume. The title references the MC5 album Kick Out the Jams.

Marsh's third Sirius program, the political talk show Live From the Land of Hopes and Dreams, airs Sunday afternoons on Sirius Left, channel 146 and America Left, channel 167 on XM Satellite Radio.

Charitable causes
Marsh is a co-founder and trustee of the Kristen Ann Carr Fund, created in memory of his step-daughter who died in 1993 from sarcoma, a form of cancer. The fund is dedicated to supporting research in the treatment and cure of sarcoma, as well as improving the lives of young adult cancer patients and their families.

Marsh is also a member of the National Advisory Board of PROTECT: The National Association to Protect Children.

Bibliography 

 Born to Run: The Bruce Springsteen Story, (Doubleday) 1979
 The Book of Rock Lists, (Dell) 1980
 Elvis, (Times Books) 1982
 Rocktopicon: Unlikely questions and their surprising answers, (Contemporary) 1982
 Before I Get Old: The Story of the Who, (St. Martin's Press) 1983
 Fortunate Son (Random House) 1983. A collection of his journalism and criticism.
 The First Rock and Roll Confidential Report: Inside the Real World of Rock and Roll, 1984. Compilation.
 Sun City: The Making of the Record ,(Penguin) 1985
 Trapped: Michael Jackson and the Crossover Dream, (Bantam) 1986
 The Rolling Stone Record Guide: Reviews and Ratings of Almost 10,000 Currently Available Rock, Pop, Soul, Country, Blues, Jazz, and Gospel Albums (first and second editions 1979, 1983)
 Glory Days: Bruce Springsteen in the 1980s, 1987. A sequel to Born to Run.
 
 Heaven Is Under Our Feet: A Book for Walden Woods, co-editor with Don Henley, (Longmeadow Press, 1991)
 50 Ways to Fight Censorship: And Important Facts to Know About the Censors (Thunder's Mouth Press), 1991
 Louie Louie: The History and Mythology of the World's Most Famous Rock'n'Roll song; Including the Full Details of Its Torture and Persecution at the Hands of the Kingsmen, J. Edgar Hoover's F.B.I., and a Cast of Millions; and Introducing, for the First Time Anywhere, the Actual Dirty Lyrics, (Hyperion), 1992.
 Merry Christmas Baby: Holiday Music from Bing to Sting, (Little Brown) 1992.
 Pastures of Plenty: A Self-Portrait with Harold Leventhal and featuring the writings of Woody Guthrie (Perennial) 1992
 The New Book of Rock Lists with James Bernard, (Fireside) 1994
 Mid-Life Confidential: The Rock Bottom Remainders Tour America with Three Chords and an Attitude (Viking) 1994
 Sam and Dave (For the Record series), (Harper Perennial) 1998
 Sly and the Family Stone: An Oral History (For the Record series), (Quill) 1998
 George Clinton & P-Funkadelic (For the Record series), (Harper Perennial) 1998
 Bruce Springsteen: Two Hearts : The Definitive Biography, 1972-2003, (Routledge) 2003. Combines earlier two works about Bruce and adds a new chapter.
 Forever Young: Photographs of Bob Dylan with Douglas R. Gilbert (Da Capo Press) 2005
 Bruce Springsteen on Tour : 1968-2005 (Bloomsbury USA) 2006
 The Beatles' Second Album (Rodale Books) 2007
 360 Sound: The Columbia Records Story - Legends and Legacy'' (Chronicle Books) 2012

See also
Lester Bangs
Robert Christgau
Greil Marcus
Jann Wenner

References

External links

 Rock and Rap Confidential
 Biographical Information for Dave Marsh
 Rock's Back Pages (list of articles)
 The Heart of Rock and Soul

1950 births
Living people
Wayne State University alumni
American music critics
American music journalists
Bruce Springsteen
Grammy Award winners
Writers from Detroit
Rolling Stone people